Großer Benzer See is a lake in Malente, Holsteinische Schweiz, Schleswig-Holstein, Germany.

Lakes of Schleswig-Holstein